The 1902 season was the first season of competitive football in Norway. This page lists results from Norwegian football in 1902.

Cup

First round

|colspan="3" style="background-color:#97DEFF"|1 June 1902

Odd had a walkover

Semifinal

|colspan="3" style="background-color:#97DEFF"|15 June 1902

Odd had a walkover

Final

References

External links
RSSSF Norwegian Football Archive

 
Seasons in Norwegian football